Virudhunagar Hindu Nadars' Senthikumara Nadar College, is a general degree college located in Virudhunagar, Tamil Nadu. It was established in the year 1947. The college is affiliated with Madurai Kamaraj University. This college offers different courses in arts, commerce and science.

Departments

Science
Physics
Chemistry
Mathematics
Computer Science
Information Technology
Botany
Zoology
Microbiology
Environmental Science

Arts and Commerce
Tamil
English
History
Economics
Business Administration
Commerce
Computer Application

Accreditation
The college is  recognized by the University Grants Commission (UGC).

References

External links

Educational institutions established in 1947
1947 establishments in India
Colleges affiliated to Madurai Kamaraj University
Academic institutions formerly affiliated with the University of Madras